The title Scottish Footballers of the Year may refer to the winner of either:

Scottish Football Writers' Association Footballer of the Year
PFA Scotland Players' Player of the Year